Relya may refer to:
Relya, a diminutive of the Russian male first name Avrelian
Relya, a diminutive of the Russian male first name Avrely
Relya, a diminutive of the Russian female first name Avreliya